Agri S. S. Krishnamurthy is an Indian politician and was a member of the 14th Tamil Nadu Legislative Assembly from Kalasapakkam constituency. As a representative of the Anna Dravida Munnetra Kazhagam, he was previously elected to the same constituency in the 2006 elections.

The elections of 2016 resulted in his constituency being won by V. Panneerselvam.

Personal life
Born in an agricultural family of Tuluva Vellala commune of Elathur village in the present Kalasapakkam taluk of Tiruvannamalai district on 26 September 1959. Father S. Sundaresan and Mother Jagadambal. Married to Vijayakumari and is father of three children. He served as Chairman of Kalasapakkam Panchayat Union in the initial part of his career.

Political career
He was re-elected from Kalasapakkam constituency as a Member of Legislative Assembly in 2011 assembly election on an AIADMK ticket and was included in the Jayalalithaa ministry as Food minister. Later his portfolio was altered and he was given Commercial Taxes department. Again in a short period his portfolio was changed to Education and within a week from this change he was dropped from the cabinet. He is an agricultural graduate and thus earned the nickname 'Agri'.

Krishnamoorthy replaced S. Damodaran as Minister for Agriculture in the Government of Tamil Nadu on 19 May 2014, when Jayalalithaa reshuffled her government. He was removed from the post in 2015 when a department official committed suicide and it was alleged that Krishnamoorthy had been placing undue pressure on him.

References 

Tamil Nadu MLAs 2011–2016
All India Anna Dravida Munnetra Kazhagam politicians
Living people
1959 births
Tamil Nadu MLAs 2006–2011
Tamil Nadu MLAs 2021–2026